Abu Muhammad Hasan ibn Yusuf al-Mustanjid (1142 – 27 March 1180) usually known by his regnal title al-Mustadi was the Abbasid Caliph in Baghdad from 1170 to 1180. He succeeded his father al-Mustanjid in 1170 as the Caliph.

Biography 
Al-Mustadi was the son of caliph al-Mustanjid and his mother was Ghadha. He was born in 1142. His full name was Hasan ibn Yusuf al-Mustanjid and his Kunya was Abu Muhammad. He was named after 5th caliph al-Hasan. When his father al-Mustanjid died on 18 December 1170, he succeeded him.

Al-Mustadi's reign is noted in general for its extensive building activities. He is said to have rebuilt al-Taj palace in Baghdad which was first constructed by 10th-century Abbasid caliph al-Muktafī (r. 902–908) and there was a great construction project of mosques, schools, religious endowments in his reign. His two spouses Sayyida Banafsha and Zumurrud Khatun, where especially prolific in these efforts. Banafsha was the follower of Hanbali school of thought, ordered the construction of a bridge in Baghdad in 570 AH/1174 CE, that was named after her.

Like his predecessor, he continued to occupy a more or less independent position, with a vizier and courtly surroundings, and supported by only a small force sufficient for an occasional local campaign. During his reign, Saladin ended the Shia Fatimid Caliphate, became the Sultan of Egypt and declared his allegiance to the Abbasids.

Towards the end of 1169, Saladin, with reinforcements from Nur ad-Din, defeated a massive Crusader-Byzantine force near Damietta. Afterward, in the spring of 1170, Nur ad-Din sent Saladin's father to Egypt in compliance with Saladin's request, as well as encouragement from the Baghdad-based Abbasid caliph, al-Mustanjid, who aimed to pressure Saladin in deposing his rival caliph, al-Adid. Saladin himself had been strengthening his hold on Egypt and widening his support base there. He began granting his family members high-ranking positions in the region; he ordered the construction of a college for the Maliki branch of Sunni Islam in the city, as well as one for the Shafi'i denomination to which he belonged in al-Fustat.

After establishing himself in Egypt, Saladin launched a campaign against the Crusaders, besieging Darum in 1170. Amalric withdrew his Templar garrison from Gaza to assist him in defending Darum, but Saladin evaded their force and captured Gaza in 1187. In 1191 Saladin destroyed the fortifications in Gaza build by King Baldwin III for the Knights Templar. It is unclear exactly when, but during that same year, he attacked and captured the Crusader castle of Eilat, built on an island off the head of the Gulf of Aqaba. It did not pose a threat to the passage of the Muslim navy but could harass smaller parties of Muslim ships and Saladin decided to clear it from his path.

According to Imad ad-Din, Nur ad-Din wrote to Saladin in June 1171, telling him to reestablish the Abbasid caliphate in Egypt, which Saladin coordinated two months later after additional encouragement by Najm ad-Din al-Khabushani, the Shafi'i faqih, who vehemently opposed Shia rule in the country. Several Egyptian emirs were thus killed, but al-Adid was told that they were killed for rebelling against him. He then fell ill or was poisoned according to one account. While ill, he asked Saladin to pay him a visit to request that he take care of his young children, but Saladin refused, fearing treachery against the Abbasids, and is said to have regretted his action after realizing what al-Adid had wanted. He died on 13 September, and five days later, the Abbasid khutba was pronounced in Cairo and al-Fustat, proclaiming al-Mustadi as caliph.

Benjamin of Tudela, who traveled to this area between 1160 and 1173, noted: "Two days from Akbara stands Baghdad. The large metropolis of Calif Emir-al-Mumenin al Abassi Amir al-Mu'minin, of the family of their prophet, who is chief of the Mahometan religion. All Mahometan kings acknowledge him, and he holds the same dignity over them which the Pope enjoys over the Christians. The palace of the Caliph at Baghdad is three miles in extent. It contains a large park filled with all sorts of trees, both useful and ornamental, and all kinds of beasts, as well as a pond of water carried thither from the river Tigris; and whenever the Caliph desires to enjoy himself and to sport and carouse, birds, beasts and fishes are prepared for him and for his courtiers, whom he invites to his palace. This great Abassid is extremely friendly towards the Jews, many of his officers being of that nation; he understands all languages, is well versed in Mosaic law, and reads and writes the Hebrew tongue. He enjoys nothing but what he earns by the labor of his own hands, and therefore manufactures coverlets, which he stamps with his seal, and which his officers sell in the public market..." 

In 1180, Caliph Al-Mustadi died and was succeeded by his son Al-Nasir.

Family
One of Al-Mustadi's concubines was Zumurrud Khatun. She was a Turkish, and was the mother of the future Caliph Al-Nasir. She died in December 1202–January 1203, or January–February 1203, and was buried in her own mausoleum in Sheikh Maarouf Cemetery. Another of his concubines was Al-Sayyida Banafsha. She was the daughter of Abdullah, a Greek, and was Al-Mustadi's favourite concubine. She died on 27 December 1201, and was buried in the mausoleum of Zumurrud Khatun in Sheikh Maarouf Cemetery. Another concubine was Sharaf Khatun. She was a Turkish, and was the mother of Prince Abu Mansur Hashim. She died on 27 December 1211, and was buried in the Rusafah Cemetey.

See also 
 Ibn al-Jawzi was an Arab Muslim jurisconsult, preacher, orator, heresiographer, traditionist, historian, judge, hagiographer, and philologist.

References

Bibliography
 
 
 
 This text is adapted from William Muir's public domain, The Caliphate: Its Rise, Decline, and Fall.

1142 births
1180 deaths
12th-century Abbasid caliphs
People of the Nizari–Seljuk wars
Sons of Abbasid caliphs